Clusia major is a tropical plant species in the genus Clusia. The name Clusia major is sometimes misapplied to the more widely distributed species Clusia rosea, which, however has petiolate (versus virtually sessile), very dark (versus bright) green leaves that are widest just below the apex (versus near the middle), and 8 (versus 5) stigmas. Fruits of C. rosea are about as long as wide (versus noticeably longer than wide in C. major).

Distribution
Clusia major occurs in the Lesser Antilles.

References

External links

major
Trees of the Caribbean
Plants described in 1753
Taxa named by Carl Linnaeus
Flora without expected TNC conservation status